Ali Rehman Khan is a Pakistani actor who appears in Urdu films, television series and theater plays. Khan has won two Hum Awards and has been nominated twice at the Lux Style Awards for his acting prowess.

Born and raised in Islamabad, Khan pursued bachelor's in business management from the University College of Islamabad and master's from the University of London. He made his acting debut with the road-comedy Gol Chakkar (2012)starring Hamza Aslam, Junaid and Jawad Jahangir and then starred in the romantic television drama Rishtay Kuch Adhooray Se (2013), which earned him wider recognition. He rose to prominence with starring roles in the television series, such as the romance Muhabbat Ab Nahi Hugi (2014) and the acclaimed family drama Diyar-e-Dil (2015). Khan achieved further success by featuring in the commercially successful romantic comedies Janaan (2016), Parchi (2018) and Heer Maan Ja (2019), the first of these earned him the Lux Style Award for Best Supporting Actor nomination.

Life and career 
Rehman was born in Islamabad, Islamabad Capital Territory, Pakistan on 6 May 1989. He attended the University College of Islamabad and went on to receives his postgraduate degree un Business Management from the University of London. He is an ethnic Pashtun Marwat.

Rehman made his acting debut in television with a leading role in the Hum TV's romantic drama series Rishtay Kuch Adhooray Se in 2013. He then starred in the 2014 drama serial Muhabbat Ab Nahi Hugi. He played Suhaib Bakhtiyar Khan in his third drama serial Diyar-e-Dil which was premiered on March 17, 2015 along with Hareem Farooq, Meekal Zulfiqar and Sanam Saeed. Khan's film credits include Slackistan and the comedy-drama Gol Chakkar. Both films are still unreleased; Slackistan was banned by Central Board of Film Censors (CBFC), Pakistan due to strong language and dialogue. Gol Chakkar was approved and was screened in October 2012. He was cast in the romantic-comedy film Janaan with fellow television actors Bilal Ashraf and Armeena Khan. The film was released on  September 13, 2016 in theaters and garnered him praise as well as the Lux Style Award for Best Supporting Actor nomination.

Filmography

Films

Television

Awards and nominations

See also 

 List of Lollywood actors

References

External links 
 

Alumni of the University of London
Living people
Pakistani male film actors
Pakistani male television actors
Pashtun people
People from Islamabad
1988 births